"Lapdance" is a song by American rock/hip hop band N.E.R.D. from their debut studio album, In Search Of.... The nu metal song features rappers Vita and Lee Harvey, and was produced by the Neptunes.  The song compares politicians to strippers giving a lap dance for free, due to the use of their excessive propaganda without ever taking action.

It was ranked number 93 on VH1's "100 Greatest Songs of Hip Hop".

A remix of "Lapdance" by Trent Reznor appeared on the compilation album Spin This. Although it is censored, an uncensored version of the remix is available on a rare promo single disc. A remix of "Lapdance" by Paul Oakenfold appeared on the soundtrack album Swordfish. 

In 2020, the UK band Wargasm released a cover of the single.

Charts

Certifications

Usage in other media
 In 2001, the song was included in the soundtrack of Kiss of the Dragon.
 A brief snippet of the song was used in the Scrubs episode "My Fifteen Minutes".
 Featured in the 2002 video game BMX XXX.
 In 2003, the song was featured in the pilot for The WB teen drama, One Tree Hill.
 Featured in the 2003 video game True Crime: Streets of LA.
 Remixed version of "Lapdance" was featured in the 2003 superhero film, Daredevil.
 In the 2009 video game, DJ Hero, "Lapdance" is mixed with two songs: "The Big Beat" by Billy Squier and "Rockit" by Herbie Hancock. The latter was mixed by Grandmaster Flash.
 In the 2011 episode of Black Mirror, "Fifteen Million Merits", the instrumental for the song was featured in an advertisement for the fictional pornographic show, Wraith Babes.
 In 2011, "Lapdance" was released as DLC for the 2010 video game Dance Central
 In 2013, "Lapdance" was used in the trailer for the film Identity Thief.
 In 2014, the song was used in the trailer for the film Penguins of Madagascar.
 In 2014, the song was used in the film Step Up: All In.
 In 2015, the song was used in the trailer and TV Spot for the film, Paul Blart: Mall Cop 2 and Daddy's Home.
 In 2019, it featured in the second episode of season 7 of Orange Is the New Black.
In 2022, it appeared in the Netflix special, ' ' The House ' '

References

2001 debut singles
2001 songs
N.E.R.D. songs
Song recordings produced by the Neptunes
Songs written by Chad Hugo
Songs written by Pharrell Williams
Nu metal songs
Rap rock songs